The 2016 Florida Gators baseball team represented the University of Florida in the sport of baseball during the 2016 college baseball season.  The Gators competed in the Eastern Division of the Southeastern Conference (SEC).  They played their home games at Alfred A. McKethan Stadium on the university's Gainesville, Florida campus.  The team was coached by Kevin O'Sullivan in his ninth season as Florida head coach.  The Gators entered the season hoping to build upon their performance in the 2015 NCAA Tournament, where they finished third at the 2015 College World Series after two losses to the Virginia Cavaliers.

Roster

By player

By position

Coaching staff

Schedule

! style="background:#FF4A00;color:white;"| Regular Season
|- valign="top" 

|- bgcolor="#ddffdd"
| February 19 ||  || No. 1 || McKethan Stadium Gainesville, FL || 4–2 || Shore (1–0) || Anderson (0–1) || Dunning (1) || 5,778 || 1–0 || –
|- bgcolor="#ddffdd"
|  || Florida Gulf Coast || No. 1 || McKethan Stadium || 8–4 || Singer (1–0) || Koerner (0–1) || None || 4,682 || 2–0 || –
|- bgcolor="#ddffdd"
| February 21 || Florida Gulf Coast || No. 1 || McKethan Stadium ||  12–3 || Faedo (1–0) || Leon (0–1) || None || 4,110 || 3–0 || –
|- bgcolor="#ddffdd"
| February 23 ||  || No. 1 || McKethan Stadium ||  12–4 || Dunning (1–0) || Shul (0–1) || None || 2,673 || 4–0 || –
|- bgcolor="#ddffdd"
| February 24 ||  || No. 1 ||   Lakeland, FL ||  8–7 || Anderson (1–0) || Delaplane (1–1) || None || 2,692 || 5–0 || –
|- bgcolor="#ddffdd"
| February 26 || at No. 6 Miami (FL)Rivalry || No. 1 || Alex Rodriguez Park Coral Gables, FL ||  5–0 || Shore (2–0) || Woodrey (1–1) || None || 4,147 || 6–0 || –
|- bgcolor="#ffdddd"
| February 27 || at No. 6 Miami (FL)Rivalry || No. 1 || Alex Rodriguez Park || 3–5 ||  || Puk (0–1) ||  || 4,999 || 6–1 || –
|- bgcolor="#ddffdd"
| February 28 || at No. 6 Miami (FL)Rivalry || No. 1 || Alex Rodriguez Park || 7–3 || Faedo (2–0) ||  || None || 4,784 || 7–1 || –
|-

|-
|- bgcolor="#ddffdd"
| March 1 || at  || No. 1 || Jay Bergman Field Orlando, FL || 9–5 || Horvath (1–0) || Deramo (1–1) || Rubio (1) || 3,831 || 8–1 || –
|- bgcolor="#ddffdd"
| March 2 || UCF || No. 1 || McKethan Stadium || 4–0 || Kowar (1–0) ||  || None || 2,937 || 9–1 || –
|- bgcolor="#ddffdd"
| March 4 ||  || No. 1 || McKethan Stadium  || 7–0 || Shore (3–0) || Robinson (0–2) || None || 2,956 || 10–1 || –
|- bgcolor="#ddffdd"
| March 5 || Dartmouth || No. 1 || McKethan Stadium || 4–312 ||  || Danielak (0–1) || None || 3,477 || 11–1 || –
|- bgcolor="#ddffdd"
| March 6 || Dartmouth || No. 1 || McKethan Stadium  || 8–6 || Faedo (3–0) || Chatham (0–2) || Horvath (1) || 3,359 || 12–1 || –
|- bgcolor="#ddffdd"
| March 8 || at  || No. 1 || Harmon Stadium Jacksonville, FL || 6–2 || Snead (1–0) || Naylor (1–2) || None || 1,674 || 13–1 || –
|- bgcolor="#ddffdd"
| March 9 || North Florida || No. 1 || McKethan Stadium || 5–4 || Kowar (2–0) || Drury (1–1) || Anderson (1) || 3,111 || 14–1 || –
|- bgcolor="#ddffdd"
| March 11 ||  || No. 1 || McKethan Stadium || 16–5 || Shore (4–0) || Miller (0–2) || None || 3,978 || 15–1 || –
|- bgcolor="#ddffdd"
| March 12 || Harvard || No. 1 || McKethan Stadium || 9–2 || Singer (2–0) || Poppen (1–1) || None || 4,498 || 16–1 || –
|- bgcolor="#ddffdd"
| March 12 || Harvard || No. 1 || McKethan Stadium || 9–2 || Faedo (4–0) || Gruener (1–1) || Snead (1) || 2,888 || 17–1 || –
|- bgcolor="#ddffdd"
| March 15 || No. 11 Florida StateRivalry || No. 1 || McKethan Stadium || 6–0 || Dunning (2–0) || Holton (0–2) || None || 5,917 || 18–1 || –
|- bgcolor="#ddffdd"
| March 18 || Missouri || No. 1 || McKethan Stadium || 4–310 || Anderson (3–0) || Sharp (2–1) || None || 5,537 || 19–1 || 1–0
|- bgcolor="#ddffdd"
| March 19 || Missouri || No. 1 || McKethan Stadium || 6–2 || Puk (1–1) || Houck (2–2) || Anderson (2) || 4,059 || 20–1 || 2–0
|- bgcolor="#ddffdd"
| March 20 || Missouri || No. 1 || McKethan Stadium || 7–5 || Faedo (5–0) || Tribby (2–2) || Anderson (3) || 3,352 || 21–1 || 3–0
|- bgcolor="#ddffdd"
| March 22 || No. 19  || No. 1 || McKethan Stadium || 2–1 || Rubio (1–0) || McKay (2–2) || Singer (1) || 3,792 || 22–1 || 3–0
|- bgcolor="#ddffdd"
| March 25 || at  || No. 1 || Lexington, KY || 12–5 || Shore (5–0) || Brown (1–4) || None || 2,364 || 23–1 || 4–0
|- bgcolor="#ffdddd"
| March 26 || at Kentucky || No. 1 || Cliff Hagan Stadium || 4–7 || Beggs (6–0) || Puk (1–2) || Lewis (1) || 3,071  || 23–2 || 4–1
|- bgcolor="#ffdddd"
| March 27 || at Kentucky || No. 1 || Cliff Hagan Stadium || 4–5 || Hjelle (3–0) || Dunning (2–1)  || None || 2,247 || 23–3 || 4–2
|- bgcolor="#ddffdd"
| March 29 || Rivalry || No. 3 || Baseball Grounds Jacksonville, FL || 3–2 || Kowar (3–0) || Carlton (4–1) || Anderson (4) || 9,035 || 24–3 || 4–2
|-

|- bgcolor="#ddffdd"
| April 1 || No. 1 Texas A&M || No. 3 || McKethan Stadium || 7–4 || Snead (2–0) || Ivey (2–1) || Anderson (5) || 5,917 || 25–3 || 5–2
|- bgcolor="#ddffdd"
| April 2 || No. 1 Texas A&M || No. 3 || McKethan Stadium || 7–2 || Faedo (6–0) || Simonds (5–1) || Dunning (2) || 5,339 || 26–3 || 6–2
|- bgcolor="#ddffdd"
| April 3 || No. 1 Texas A&M || No. 3 || McKethan Stadium || 10–7 || Snead (3–0) || Hendrix (0–1) || Anderson (6) || 4,824 || 27–3 || 7–2
|- bgcolor="#ddffdd"
| April 5 ||  || No. 1 || McKethan Stadium || 7–2 || Moss (1–0) || Arjona (2–1) || None || 2,894 || 28–3 || 7–2
|- bgcolor="#ddffdd"
| April 8 ||  || No. 1 || McKethan Stadium || 8–2 || Shore (6–0) || Hudson (4–2) || None || 3,927 || 29–3 || 8–2
|- bgcolor="#ffdddd"
| April 9 || No. 10 Mississippi State || No. 1 || McKethan Stadium || 4–10 || Rigby (4–1) || Faedo (6–1) || None || 6,244 || 29–4 || 8–3
|- bgcolor="#ffdddd"
| April 10 || No. 10 Mississippi State || No. 1 || McKethan Stadium || 1–2 || Houston (2–0) || Dunning (2–2) || Humphreys (3) || 3,720 || 29–5 || 8–4
|- bgcolor="#ddffdd"
| April 12 || at No. 6 Florida StateRivalry || No. 2 ||  Tallahassee, FL || 8–2 || Rubio (2–0) || E. Voyles (0–1) || None || 5,936 || 30–5 || 8–4
|- bgcolor="#ddffdd"
| April 14 || at Arkansas || No. 2 || Baum Stadium Fayetteville, AR || 12–8 || Puk (2–2) || Taccolini (3–2) || Anderson (7) || 8,348 || 31–5 || 9–4
|- bgcolor="#ddffdd"
| April 15 || at Arkansas || No. 2 || Baum Stadium || 9–2 || Shore (7–0) ||  || None || 9,219 || 32–5 || 10–4
|- bgcolor="#ddffdd"
| April 16 || at Arkansas || No. 2 || Baum Stadium  ||  8–2 ||  Faedo (7–1) ||  Jackson (2–4) ||  None || 9,371 || 33–5 ||11–4
|- bgcolor="#ddffdd"
| April 19 || Jacksonville || No. 2 || McKethan Stadium || 3–1 || Rubio (3–0) || Schappell (2–2) || Anderson (8) || 2,658 || 34–5 || 11–4
|- bgcolor="#ffdddd"
| April 21 ||  || No. 2 || McKethan Stadium || 1–212 || Holder (1–2) || Rubio (3–1) || None || 3,256 || 34–6 || 11–5
|- bgcolor="#ddffdd"
| April 22 || Georgia || No. 2 || McKethan Stadium || 6–0 || Shore (8–0) || Jones (5–3) || None || 4,005 || 35–6 || 12–5
|- bgcolor="#ddffdd"
| April 23 || Georgia || No. 2 || McKethan Stadium || 4–1 || Faedo (8–1) || Tucker (3–4) || Anderson (9) || 4,488 || 36–6 || 13–5
|- bgcolor="#ddffdd"
| April 29 || at No. 5 South Carolina || No. 1 || Founders Park Columbia, SC ||  5–4 ||   || Reagan (1–2)  ||  || 7,948 || 37–6 || 14–5
|- bgcolor="#ffdddd"
| April 30 || at No. 5 South Carolina || No. 1 || Founders Park || 1–2  || Webb (9–2) || Snead (3–1)  || Johnson (4) || 8,242 || 37–7 || 14–6
|-

|- bgcolor="#bbbbbb"
| May 1 ||  || No. 1 || Founders Park || colspan=7 | Cancelled (weather) 
|- bgcolor="#ddffdd"
| May 3 ||  || No. 1 || McKethan Stadium || 7–1 || Moss (2–0) ||  || None || 2,692 || 38–7 || 14–6
|- bgcolor="#ddffdd"
| May 6 || at Tennessee || No. 1 ||  Knoxville, TN || 7–2 || Shore (9–0) || Neely (1–2) || None || 2,247 || 39–7 || 15–6
|- bgcolor="#ffdddd"
| May 7 || at Tennessee || No. 1 || Lindsey Nelson Stadium || 2–5 || Cox (3–5) || Singer (2–1) || None || 2,197 || 39–8 || 15–7
|- bgcolor="#ddffdd"
| May 8 || at Tennessee || No. 1 || Lindsey Nelson Stadium || 9–3 || Faedo (9–1) || Martin (3–1) || None || 2,458 || 40–8 || 16–7
|- bgcolor="#ddffdd"
| May 10 ||  || No. 1 || McKethan Stadium || 11–4 || Dunning (4–2) || Bye (0–1) || None || 2,881 || 41–8 || 16–7
|- bgcolor="#ddffdd"
| May 13 || No. 7 Vanderbilt || No. 1 || McKethan Stadium || 4–2 || Shore (10–0) || Sheffield (7–4) || None || 4,537 || 42–8 || 17–7
|- bgcolor="#ffdddd"
| May 14 || No. 7 Vanderbilt || No. 1 || McKethan Stadium || 0–5 || Wright (7–3) || Puk (2–3) || None || 4,783 || 42–9 || 17–8
|- bgcolor="#ddffdd"
| May 15 || No. 7 Vanderbilt || No. 1 || McKethan Stadium || 10–6 || Faedo (10–1) || Kilichowski (0–2) || None || 4,340 || 43–9 || 18–8
|- bgcolor="#ffdddd"
| May 19 || at No. 8  || No. 1 || Alex Box Stadium Baton Rouge, LA || 3–7 || Smith (2–0) || Singer (2–2) || Bugg (3) || 10,904 || 43–10 || 18–9
|- bgcolor="#ffdddd"
| May 20 || at No. 8 LSU || No. 1 || Alex Box Stadium || 4–5 ||  || Horvath (1–1) || Newman (6) || 10,904 || 43–11 || 18–10
|- bgcolor="#ddffdd"
| May 21 || at No. 8 LSU || No. 1 || Alex Box Stadium || 6–27 || Faedo (11–1) || Gilbert (4–3) || None || 11,303 || 44–11 || 19–10
|-
| colspan=11 | The game was suspended during the third inning due to rain and continued at 11:05 a.m. on May 21 prior to the start of the game scheduled for that day.
|-

|-
! style="background:#FF4A00;color:white;"| Postseason
|-

|-
|- bgcolor="#ffdddd"
| May 25 || No. 7 (5) LSU ||  ||  Hoover, AL || 3–514  || Stallings (3–0) ||   || None || 13,448 || 44–12 || 0–1
|- bgcolor="#ddffdd"
| May 26 || (9) Alabama ||  || Metropolitan Stadium || 5–4 ||  || Burrows (2–1) || Anderson (11) || 5,232 || 45–12 || 1–1
|- align="center" bgcolor=" ddffdd"
| May 27 ||  ||  || Metropolitan Stadium || 12–27 || Faedo (12–1) || Sexton (7–3) || None || 9,429 || 46–12 || 2–1
|- bgcolor="#ddffdd"
| May 28 || No. 7 (5) LSU ||  || Metropolitan Stadium || 1–0 || Moss (3–0) || Gilbert (4–4) ||  || 13,821 || 47–12 || 3–1
|- bgcolor="#ffdddd"
| May 29 || No. 2 (3) Texas A&M ||  || Metropolitan Stadium || 5–12 || Vinson (4–2) || Byrne (0–1) || None || 8,352 || 47–13 || 3–2
|-

|-
|- bgcolor="#ddffdd"
| June 3 ||  ||  ||  || 9–3 || Shore (11–0) || Norris (6–4) || None || 2,965 || 48–13 || 1–0
|- bgcolor="#ddffdd"
| June 4 || (3) Connecticut ||  || McKethan Stadium || 6–5 || Dunning (5–3) || Over (0–4) ||  || 3,027 || 49–13 || 2–0
|- bgcolor="#ddffdd"
| June 5 || (2)  ||  || McKethan Stadium || 10–1 || Faedo (13–1) || Pitts (3–4) || None || 2,293 || 50–13 || 3–0
|-

|- bgcolor="#ffdddd"
| June 11 || No. 13 Florida StateRivalry ||  || McKethan Stadium || 0–3 || Carlton (8–3) || Faedo (13–2) || None || 5,768 || 50–14 || 0–1
|- bgcolor="#ddffdd"
| June 12 || No. 13 Florida StateRivalry ||  || McKethan Stadium || 5–0 || Shore (12–0) || Holton (3–4) || None || 5,326 || 51–14 || 1–1
|- bgcolor="#ddffdd"
| June 13 || No. 13 Florida StateRivalry ||  || McKethan Stadium || 7–0 || Dunning (6–3) || Sands (6–7) || None || 4,475 || 52–14 || 2–1
|-

|-
|- bgcolor="#ffdddd"
| June 19 ||  ||  || Omaha, NE || 1–2 ||  || Shore (12–1) || None || 19,696 || 52–15 || 0–1
|- bgcolor="#ffdddd"
| June 21 || No. 11 (4) Texas Tech ||  || TD Ameritrade Park || 2–3 || Martin (10–1) || Faedo (13–3) || Howard (9) || 16,865 || 52–16 || 0–2
|-

Rankings from USA Today/ESPN Top 25 coaches' baseball poll. All times Eastern. Parentheses indicate tournament seedings. Retrieved from FloridaGators.com

Record vs. conference opponents

Rankings

References

Florida
Florida Gators baseball seasons
Florida
College World Series seasons